Gabriela Wiener (born 1975 Lima) is a Peruvian writer, chronicler, poet and journalist. She is part of the group of new Latin American chroniclers. She has settled in Spain since 2003.

Life 
She is daughter of the prominent political analyst and Peruvian journalist Raúl Wiener and social worker Elsi Bravo.

She studied linguistics and literature at the Pontifical Catholic University of Peru, and a master's degree in historical culture and communications at the University of Barcelona, where she lived from 2003 to 2011. Since then she has lived in Madrid.

She worked in the newspaper El Comercio. She was a member of the editorial board of  magazine. She was also editor in chief of the Spanish magazine Primera Línea and the Spanish edition of Marie Claire magazine.

She has written for Corriere della Sera, Words Without Borders, The White Review, Virginia Quarterly Review, Orsai, Esquire, Revue XXI, Clarin, El Universal, El Mercurio, La Vanguardia, among others.

She is currently a columnist for the Peruvian newspaper La República, a correspondent for the magazine Etiqueta Negra and a frequent contributor to El País. She also conducts interviews for La República and La Mula.

She is the author of the books "Llamada perdida", "Sexografías", "Nueve Lunas", "Mozart, the iguana with priapism and other stories". And the book of poems "Exercises for the hardening of the spirit".

Works 
Cosas que deja la gente cuando se va, Pontificia Universidad Católica del Perú, Estudios Generales Letras, 2007. 
Llamada perdida, Editorial: Estruendomudo, 2014. ; Malpaso Ediciones, 2015, 
Sexografías, San Isidro, Lima, Perú: Editorial Planeta, julio 2015. , 
Sexografías, Restless Books, 2018. , 
Nueve Lunas, Lima, Perú: Seix Barral, 2015. , 
Mozart, the iguana with priapism and other stories.
Ejercicios para el endurecimiento del espíritu, Lima, Perú: Pesopluma, 2016. ,

References 

Pontifical Catholic University of Peru alumni
Peruvian women writers
People from Lima
1975 births
Peruvian people of German descent
Peruvian poets
Peruvian women journalists
Peruvian women columnists
Living people